Gwinnett can refer to:

Button Gwinnett, signatory of the US Declaration of Independence
Gwinnett County, in the US state of Georgia
Gwinnett Ballet Theatre, Gwinnett County's first non-profit performing arts troupe
The Gwinnett Stripers, a Triple-A baseball team
Gwinnett Daily Post
Gwinnett Technical College
Gwinnett Gladiators
Georgia Gwinnett College
USS Gwinnett (AG-92)
Gwinnett Medical Center
Gwinnett Place Mall a regional shopping mall in the county